Anostomus longus is  small species of fish in the family Anostomidae. It is found in the upper Amazon of Peru.

References

Anostomidae
Endemic fauna of Peru
Fish of Peru
Taxa named by Jacques Géry
Fish described in 1961